Mid-August Lunch (originally released as Pranzo di ferragosto) is a 2008 Italian comedy-drama and the directorial debut of Italian actor and screenwriter Gianni Di Gregorio.  It was produced by Italian writer-director Matteo Garrone whose 2008 film Gomorrah was co-written by Di Gregorio. It currently is being distributed in the US by Zeitgeist Films.

Plot
Gianni (Gianni Di Gregorio), who is struggling to pay their flat's communal charges, is looking after his 93-year-old mother during Italy's biggest summer holiday, Ferragosto. He makes end meet by looking after other elderly women for the holidays while their families go away, including the mothers of his landlord and doctor, who will forgive his debts in exchange.

Awards and nominations
The film won the Grand Prix Award and the Audience Award at the International Film Festival Bratislava, and also won the FIPRESCI Award.  It was awarded the "Luigi De Laurentiis" Award for a First Feature Film at the 65th Venice Film Festival in 2008.  Additionally, it won awards at several other film festivals including the David Di Donatello Awards, the Satyajit Ray Award at the London Film Festival, and the Golden Snail award at the Academy of Food and Film in Bologna.

Cast
 Gianni Di Gregorio
 Valeria De Franciscis
 Maria Cali
 Grazia Cesarini Sforza
 Marina Cacciotti
 Alfonso Santagata

References

External links
 
 

2008 films
2000s Italian-language films
2008 comedy-drama films
Films set in Rome
Films directed by Gianni Di Gregorio
Italian comedy-drama films
2008 comedy films
2008 drama films
2000s Italian films